Ararat Brandy Factory may refer to:
Yerevan Ararat Brandy Factory, Armenian cognac producer in Yerevan since 1877.
Yerevan Brandy Company, Armenian cognac producer in Yerevan since 1887.